Adra may refer to:

Places 
Adra, Spain, municipality in Almería (province), Andalusia
Adra Lighthouse, lighthouse in Almería
Adra, Purulia, town in the state of West Bengal, India
Adra railway station, in West Bengal
Adra, Syria, town approximately 40 km north of Damascus
Adra, Estonia, village in Harku Parish, Harju County, Estonia

Other uses 
ADRA - Australian Dispute Resolution Association, a professional mediators body 
Adventist Development and Relief Agency, an agency of the Seventh-day Adventist Church
Adra (moth), a moth genus
Chevrolet Adra, a concept compact SUV by Chevrolet